Mona Lisa Overdrive is a science fiction novel by American-Canadian writer William Gibson, published in 1988. It is the final novel of the  cyberpunk Sprawl trilogy, following Neuromancer and Count Zero, taking place eight years after the events of the latter. The novel was nominated for the Nebula Award for Best Novel, the Hugo Award for Best Novel, and the Locus Award for Best Science Fiction Novel in 1989.

Plot
Taking place eight years after the events of Count Zero and fifteen years after Neuromancer, the story is formed from several interconnecting plot threads, and also features characters from Gibson's previous works (such as Molly Millions, the razor-fingered mercenary from Neuromancer).

Thread one:  concerns Mona, a teen prostitute who has a more-than-passing resemblance to famed Simstim superstar Angie Mitchell. Mona is hired by shady individuals for a "gig" which later turns out to be part of a plot to abduct Angie.

Thread two: focuses on a young Japanese girl named Kumiko, daughter of a Yakuza boss sent to London to keep her safe while her father engages in a gang war with other top Yakuza leaders. In London, she is cared for by one of her father's retainers, who is also a powerful member of the London Mob. She meets Molly Millions (having altered her appearance and now calling herself "Sally Shears", in order to conceal her identity from hostile parties who are implied to be pursuing her), who takes the girl under her wing.

Thread three: follows a reclusive artist named Slick Henry, who lives in a place named Factory in the Dog Solitude; a large, poisoned expanse of deserted factories and dumps, probably in southern New Jersey. Slick Henry is a convicted car thief whose punishment consisted of having his short-term memory erased every five minutes, leading to continuous confusion and dissociation. Following the end of his sentence, he spends his days creating large robotic sculptures and periodically suffers episodes of time loss, returning to consciousness afterward with no memory of what he did during the blackout. He is hired by an acquaintance to look after the comatose "Count" (Bobby Newmark from the second novel, Count Zero, who has hooked himself into a super-capacity cyber-harddrive called an Aleph).
A theoretical "Aleph" would have the RAM capacity to literally contain all of reality, enough that a memory construct of a person would contain the complete personality of the individual and allow it to learn, grow and act independently.

The final plotline follows Angela Mitchell, famous simstim star, and the girl from the second Sprawl novel Count Zero. Angie, thanks to brain manipulations by her father when she was a child, has always had the ability to access cyberspace directly (without a cyberspace deck), but drugs provided by her production company Sense/Net have severely impeded this ability.

The plot culminates when Angie and Bobby "upload" their consciousness into the Aleph, on the verge of visiting an alien artificial intelligence apparently found on a planet orbiting Centauri. Mona takes Angie's place as a simstim star following forced cosmetic surgery to make Mona look identical to Angie.

Influences 
The story of the reclusive artist who makes cybernetic sculptures is a reference to Mark Pauline of Survival Research Labs.

The name of the dense lump of cybernetic hardware that Bobby Newmark's consciousness is jacked into is a direct reference to the short story "The Aleph" by Argentinian author Jorge Luis Borges. The titular Aleph is a point in space which contains all other points, and if one were to gaze into the Aleph one would be able to see or experience the entirety of existence.

Legacy 
A track of the score for the film The Matrix Reloaded by Juno Reactor and Don Davis was named "Mona Lisa Overdrive". The Matrix trilogy was heavily influenced by Gibson's writing. A different version of the song is on Juno Reactor's album Labyrinth.

A track in the album Mista Thug Isolation by Lil Ugly Mane is titled "Mona Lisa Overdrive".

Japanese rock band Buck-Tick's album of the same name was mistakenly named as such, since Hisashi Imai confused it with Robert Longo's Samurai Overdrive when naming the album.

References

External links
 An in-depth analysis

1988 American novels
Sprawl trilogy
1988 science fiction novels
Cyberpunk novels
Dystopian novels
Novels by William Gibson
Works about the Yakuza

de:Neuromancer#Mona Lisa Overdrive